Pseudophytoecia is a genus of longhorn beetles of the subfamily Lamiinae, containing the following species:

 Pseudophytoecia africana (Aurivillius, 1914)
 Pseudophytoecia suturalis (Aurivillius, 1914)

References

Saperdini